|}

The Karndean Mares' Standard Open NH Flat Race is a Listed National Hunt flat race in Great Britain which is open to fillies and mares aged four to six years. It is run on the Old Course at Cheltenham over a distance of about 2 miles and ½ furlong (2 miles and 87 yards, or ), and it is scheduled to take place each year in November. The race has been run under various names since its inception.

Winners

See also 
 Horse racing in Great Britain
 List of British National Hunt races

References 

Racing Post:

National Hunt races in Great Britain
Cheltenham Racecourse
National Hunt flat races